Abdallah ibn Khordadbeh was a Persian general and governor for the Abbasid Caliphate.

He was the son of Khordadbeh, a Zoroastrian from Khurasan who converted to Islam. By ca. 815, Abdallah served as the governor of Tabaristan, and conquered the mountainous regions of Tabaristan from the local Bavandid ruler Sharwin I. During the same year, he campaigned in Daylam, where he conquered two cities and captured its ruler Abu Layla. In 817, he aided Mazyar, an Iranian prince, to escape from Tabaristan and reach the court of the Abbasid caliph al-Ma'mun. Abdallah was also a friend of the Persian musician Ishaq al-Mawsili.

Not much more is known about Abdallah; he had a son named Abu'l-Qasim Ubaydallah, better known as Ibn Khordadbeh, who was born in 820 in Khurasan and was later raised in Baghdad, where Abdallah probably then resided. He thereafter disappears from sources, and later died at an unknown date in the 9th-century.

References

Sources 

 

9th-century deaths
Abbasid governors of Tabaristan
Generals of the Abbasid Caliphate
Year of birth unknown
9th-century Iranian people